Alv Knutsson (c. 1420–1496) was a Norwegian nobleman who descended on his father's side from the influential and wealthy Swedish Tre Rosor noble family. He was a member of the Norwegian council of the realm and also served as commander of the royal castle in Bergen. Alv Knutsson is most famous for his involvement in the Krummedige-Tre Rosor feud.
He was the father of the Norwegian rebel leader Knut Alvsson.

Landholdings
Alv Knutsson held over 276 farms in east and south Norway. He held important Norwegian fiefs including Solør and was one of the largest property holders in Norway inheriting part of the knight and Norwegian National Councillor Sigurd Jonsson’s vast properties, including the Sørum  estate (Sudreim) in Romerike and Giske estate in Sunnmøre. His wife Magnhild Oddsdatter  (ca. 1425–1499) from Finne in Voss was the widow of  Bengt Harniktsson who died ca. 1446. Through his marriage, Alv Knutsson also held Grefsheim in Hedmark.

References and notes

1420 births
1496 deaths
15th-century Norwegian nobility
Norwegian people of Swedish descent